PS-28 Khairpur-III is a constituency of the Provincial Assembly of Sindh.

General elections 2013

The Following is the list of contesting candidates from the PS-33 for the Provincial Assembly of Sindh. Pir Syed Fazal Ali Shah Jeelani of  PPP-P got 41,890 votes and was declared as the successful candidate. However, it was also alleged that rigging was being done.

General elections 2008

See also
 PS-27 Khairpur-II
 PS-29 Khairpur-IV

References

External links
 Election commission Pakistan's official website
 Awazoday.com check result
 Official Website of Government of Sindh

Constituencies of Sindh
Thari Mirwah